Rachůnek is a Czech surname. Notable people with the surname include:

 Ivan Rachůnek (born 1981), Czech ice hockey player
 Karel Rachůnek (1979–2011), Czech ice hockey player
 Tomáš Rachůnek (born 1991), Czech ice hockey player

Czech-language surnames